The 12493 / 12494 Pune–Hazrat Nizamuddin Darshan AC Express is a Superfast Express train of the AC Express series belonging to Indian Railways – Northern Railway zone that runs between  and  in India.

It operates as train number 12493 from Pune Junction to Hazrat Nizamuddin and as train number 12494 in the reverse direction, serving the states of  Maharashtra, Gujarat, Madhya Pradesh, Rajasthan, Uttar Pradesh & Haryana.

Coaches

12493/12494 Pune–Hazrat Nizamuddin Darshan AC Express has 10 AC 3 tier, 6 AC 2 Tier, 1 AC First Class & 2 End on Generator Coaches. It carries a pantry car .

As is customary with most train services in India, coach composition may be amended at the discretion of Indian Railways depending on demand.

The train used to run with Rajdhani coaches of ICF. Now the train runs with the new and Modern LHB coach coaches.

 EOG consists of Luggage and Generator coach
 B consists of AC 3 Tier coach
 PC consists of Pantry car coach
 A consists of AC 2 Tier coach
 H consists of First Class AC coach

Service

As the average speed of the train is above , as per Indian Railways rules, its fare includes a Superfast surcharge.
The train has maximum speed of 110 kmph and is hauled by Vadodara-based WAP-7 or Ghaziabad-based WAP-5

Routing

Traction

As the route is fully electrified, a Vadodara-based WAP-7 (HOG)-equipped locomotive powers the train up to its destination.

Operation

 12493 Pune–Hazrat Nizamuddin Darshan AC Express leaves Pune Junction every Sunday & arriving Hazrat Nizamuddin the next day.
 12494 Hazrat Nizamuddin–Pune Darshan AC Express leaves Hazrat Nizamuddin every Friday &  arriving Pune the next day.

References

External links
12493 AC Express at India Rail Info
12494 AC Express at India Rail Info

Transport in Pune
Transport in Delhi
AC Express (Indian Railways) trains
Rail transport in Maharashtra
Rail transport in Gujarat
Rail transport in Madhya Pradesh
Rail transport in Rajasthan
Rail transport in Uttar Pradesh
Rail transport in Haryana
Rail transport in Delhi
Railway services introduced in 2016